Lewinella lutea  is a bacterium from the genus of Lewinella.

References

Further reading

External links 
Type strain of Lewinella lutea at BacDive -  the Bacterial Diversity Metadatabase

Bacteroidota
Bacteria described in 2007